Iceland participated in the Eurovision Song Contest 2004 with the song "Heaven" written by Sveinn Rúnar Sigurðsson and Magnús Þór Sigmundsson. The song was performed by Jónsi, who was internally selected by the Icelandic broadcaster Ríkisútvarpið (RÚV) in February 2004 to represent Iceland at the 2004 contest in Istanbul, Turkey. The Icelandic song, "Heaven", was presented to the public on 20 March 2004 during the television programme Laugardagskvöld með Gísla Marteini. 

As one of ten highest placed finishers in the 2003 contest Iceland directly qualified to compete in the final of the Eurovision Song Contest which took place on 15 May 2004. Performing in position 17, Iceland placed nineteenth out of the 24 participating countries with 16 points.

Background 

Prior to the 2004 Contest, Iceland had participated in the Eurovision Song Contest sixteen times since its first entry in 1986. Iceland's best placing in the contest to this point was second, which it achieved in 1999 with the song "All Out of Luck" performed by Selma. In 2003, Iceland placed eighth with the song "Open Your Heart" performed by Birgitta Haukdal.

The Icelandic national broadcaster, Ríkisútvarpið (RÚV), broadcasts the event within Iceland and organises the selection process for the nation's entry. RÚV confirmed their intentions to participate at the 2004 Eurovision Song Contest on 2 October 2003. Between 2000 and 2003, Iceland has used a national final to select their entry for the Eurovision Song Contest. For 2004, RÚV opted to internally select the Icelandic entry for the first time since 1999 due to financial reasons.

Before Eurovision

Internal selection 

On 23 October 2003, RÚV announced that the Icelandic entry for the Eurovision Song Contest 2004 would be selected internally. The broadcaster also opened the submission period for interested songwriters to submit their entries until the deadline on 17 November 2003. At the close of the submission deadline, 117 entries were received. A selection committee was formed in order to select the Icelandic entry, which was originally planned to be revealed in early December 2003 but later delayed to early 2004.

On 9 February 2004, "Heaven" performed by Jónsi was announced by RÚV as the Icelandic entry. The song was composed by Sveinn Rúnar Sigurðsson with lyrics by Magnús Þór Sigmundsson. Prior to the announcement of Jónsi as the Icelandic entrant, the broadcaster had denied reports that Emilana Torrini would represent Iceland with the song "Morning Light", composed by 1999 Icelandic Eurovision entrant Selma Björnsdóttir. "Heaven" was presented to the public along with the release of the official music video on 20 March 2004 during the television programme Laugardagskvöld með Gísla Marteini which was broadcast on RÚV.

At Eurovision 
It was announced that the competition's format would be expanded to include a semi-final in 2004. According to the rules, all nations with the exceptions of the host country, the "Big Four" (France, Germany, Spain and the United Kingdom) and the ten highest placed finishers in the 2003 contest are required to qualify from the semi-final in order to compete for the final; the top ten countries from the semi-final progress to the final. As Iceland finished eighth in the 2003 contest, the nation automatically qualified to compete in the final on 15 May 2004. On 23 March 2004, a special allocation draw was held which determined the running order and Iceland was set to perform in position 17 in the final, following the entry from Greece and before the entry from Ireland. Iceland placed nineteenth in the final, scoring 16 points.

The semi-final and the final were broadcast in Iceland on RÚV with commentary by Gísli Marteinn Baldursson. The Icelandic spokesperson, who announced the Icelandic votes during the final, was Sigrún Ósk Kristjánsdóttir.

Voting 
Below is a breakdown of points awarded to Iceland and awarded by Iceland in the semi-final and grand final of the contest. The nation awarded its 12 points to Denmark in the semi-final and to Ukraine in the final of the contest.

Points awarded to Iceland

Points awarded by Iceland

References 

2004
Countries in the Eurovision Song Contest 2004
Eurovision